Heligoland are a five-piece band from Melbourne, Australia. The band is now based in Paris, France. Heligoland's songs and sound have been compared to the atmospheric textures and soaring female vocals of Cocteau Twins, the spartan soulfulness of Low and the wistful melancholy of Mojave 3.

Discography

Albums

Other releases

Other projects

Several past and present members of Heligoland have been (and are still) involved in other musical projects:

 Steve has played guitar in Tugboat and has played bass guitar in Dandelion Wine
 Dave plays guitar in Tides
 Pete plays guitar in Marionettes
 Bek plays drums in Tugboat
 Steve Wheeler & Antti Mäkinen have, on occasion, toured with Robin Guthrie (Cocteau Twins) as The Robin Guthrie Trio, most notably performing a small UK tour in February 2013

References

External links
 Official Heligoland website
 Heligoland page at Ocean Music
 Heligoland page at Big Rig Records
 Bandcamp

Australian rock music groups
Musical groups established in 1999
1999 establishments in Australia